Iļja Vestermans (28 September 1915 – 2005) was a Latvian football forward of Jewish origin.

He was born in Riga. For most of his career he played with the Riga Jewish community sports club Hakoah. He made his debut in the Latvia national football team in 1935 against Lithuania and scored two goals in the match.

In the 1938 FIFA World Cup qualification Vestermans scored in both matches as Latvia beat Lithuania and scored the single goal for Latvia against Austria in the decisive match for the World Cup spot.

In his 23 matches for Latvia Vestermans scored 13 goals. He was the third-highest scorer in the Latvia national team before the start of the Soviet occupation of Latvia in 1940, however, Vestermans had far less appearances than Ēriks Pētersons and Alberts Šeibelis who had a better goal-tally. Vestermans was considered one of the most talented footballers in Latvia, rated especially high for his dribbling skills.

Vestermans left Latvia for Austria 1935 to play professionally in Hakoah Vienna, later playing in Racing Paris and in the United States to where he fled in 1938. He died at the age of 90 in Florida.

References

1915 births
2005 deaths
Footballers from Riga
Latvian footballers
Latvia international footballers
Latvian Jews
Association football forwards
Latvian emigrants to the United States